Atelestite is an arsenate mineral with the chemical formula Bi(AsO)O(OH). Its type locality is Erzgebirgskreis, Saxony, Germany.

References

External links 

 Atelestite data sheet
 Atelestite on the Handbook of Mineralogy

Bismuth minerals
Arsenate minerals
Hydroxide minerals